Kaku, Nepal  is a village development committee in Solukhumbu District in the Sagarmatha Zone of north-eastern Nepal. At the time of the 1991 Nepal census it had a population of 3896 people living in 750 individual households.

References

External links
UN map of the municipalities of Solukhumbu District

Populated places in Solukhumbu District